Singerband is a village under Singerband Gaon Panchayat in the District of Cachar (Assam), India under Lakhipur sub division.

Geography
Singerband is situated in the southern side of Borak River.  Lakhipur is the nearest subdivisional town where the villagers trade their agricultural products.  
The villagers use the ferry ghats to reach their subdivisional town by boat.  There is a connecting river bridge at Binnakandi Part 1 to their sub-divisional town.  During the monsoon season the condition of roads are pathetic.

Facilities
It has one Public health centre, four lower primary school, 3 high school including one English medium school, one Junior college.  It has two small markets.

The population of Singerband is both Muslim & Hindu & its around 50/50. Majority of the people belong to Manipuri.

External links 
 https://web.archive.org/web/20080213231110/http://cachar.nic.in/home.asp
 https://web.archive.org/web/20090410000000/http://cachar.nic.in/subdiv.html

Villages in Cachar district